The 1995 VMI Keydets football team was an American football team that represented the Virginia Military Institute (VMI) as a member of the Southern Conference (SoCon) during the 1995 NCAA Division I-AA football season. In their second year under head coach Bill Stewart, the team compiled an overall record of 4–7, with a mark of 3–5 in conference play, placing sixth in the SoCon.

Schedule

References

VMI
VMI Keydets football seasons
VMI Keydets football